Barič is a village located in the municipality of Obrenovac, Belgrade, Serbia. As of 2011 census, it has a population of 6,918 inhabitants.

History 
The remains belonging to the Scordisci, a Celtic  tribe which founded Singidunum and Taurunum, the predecessors of Belgrade and Zemun, respectively, were found in Barič.

References

External links

Suburbs of Belgrade